Thio Sport is a New Caledonian football team playing at the New Caledonia Division Honneur. It is based in Thio.

References
 

Football clubs in New Caledonia